Masaki Miyasaka (宮阪 政樹, born July 15, 1989) is a Japanese football player for Thespakusatsu Gunma.

Club statistics
Updated to 24 February 2019.

1Includes Promotion Playoffs to J1.

References

External links
Profile at Oita Trinita
Profile at Matsumoto Yamaga

1989 births
Living people
Meiji University alumni
Association football people from Tokyo
Japanese footballers
J1 League players
J2 League players
Montedio Yamagata players
Matsumoto Yamaga FC players
Oita Trinita players
Thespakusatsu Gunma players
Association football midfielders
Universiade gold medalists for Japan
Universiade medalists in football
Medalists at the 2011 Summer Universiade